August Karl Friedrich Christian von Goeben (10 December 181613 November 1880), was a Prussian infantry general, who won the Iron Cross for his service in the Franco-Prussian War of 1870–71.

Early career

Born at Stade 30 km west of Hamburg in the Kingdom of Hannover, he aspired from his earliest years to the Prussian service rather than that of his own country, and at the age of seventeen, obtained a commission in the 24th Regiment of Prussian infantry. But there was little scope for the activities of a young and energetic subaltern.
Leaving the service in 1836, he enlisted in the Carlist army fighting the First Carlist War in Spain. In the five campaigns in which he served Don Carlos, he had many turns of fortune. He had not fought for two months when he fell, severely wounded, into the hands of the Spanish royalist troops. After eight months' detention, he escaped, but it was not long before he was captured again. This time his imprisonment was long and painful, and on two occasions, he was compelled to draw lots for his life with his fellow captives.

When released, Goeben served until 1840 with distinction. In that year, he made his way back, a man without means, to Prussia. The Carlist lieutenant colonel was glad to be re-admitted into the Prussian service as a second lieutenant, but he was still young, and few subalterns could claim five years meritorious war service at the age of twenty-four. In a few years, he was a captain on the Great General Staff, and in 1848, he was transferred to the staff of the IV Corps, where his immediate superior was Major Helmuth Graf von Moltke.
The two men became fast friends, and their mutual esteem was never disturbed. In the Baden insurrection, Goeben distinguished himself on the staff of Prince William, the future emperor. He alternated staff and regimental duty in the Prussian service for some years after this, until in 1863, he was promoted to major-general commanding the 26th Infantry Brigade.

In 1860, he was present with the Spanish troops in Morocco, and took part in the Battle of Tetuan.

Military commands

In the first of Prussia's great wars, the 1864 Danish-Prussian War, he distinguished himself at the head of his brigade at Rackebüll and Sonderburg. In the 1866 Austro-Prussian War, Lieutenant-General von Goeben commanded the 13th Division, of which his old brigade formed part, and, in this higher sphere, once more displayed the qualities of a born leader and skilful tactician. He held almost independent command with conspicuous success in the actions of Dermbach (in Wartburgkreis), Laufach (in Aschaffenburg), Kissingen, Aschaffenburg, Gerchsheim, Tauberbischofsheim and Würzburg.

The mobilization of 1870 at the start of the Franco-Prussian War placed him at the head of the VIII (Rhineland Province) Corps, forming part of the First Army under von Steinmetz. It was his resolute and energetic leading that contributed mainly to the victory at the Spicheren on 6 August, and von Goeben won the only laurels gained on the Prussian right wing at Gravelotte on 18 August. Under Manteuffel, the VIII Corps took part in the operations about Amiens and Bapaume, and on 8 January 1871, Goeben succeeded that general in the command of the First Army.

A fortnight later, he brought the campaign in northern France to a brilliant conclusion, by the decisive victory at the Battle of St. Quentin (19 January 1871). The close of the Franco-Prussian War left Goeben one of the most distinguished men in the victorious army. He was colonel of the 28th Infantry, and was awarded the Grand Cross of the Iron Cross. He commanded the VIII Corps at Coblenz until his death in 1880.

Writings
General von Goeben left many writings. His memoirs are to be found in his works:
 Vier Jahre in Spanien (Four Years in Spain) (Hanover, 1841), 
 Reise-und Lagerbriefe aus Spanien und vom spanischen Heere in Marokko (Hanover, 1863) and 
 Darmstadt Allgemeine Militärzeitung.

Legacy
The former French fort de Queuleu at Metz was renamed Goeben after him, and the 28th Infantry bears his name. A statue of Goeben by Fritz Schaper was erected at Koblenz in 1884.

Honours and awards

Portrayal in media 
In the Danish miniseries 1864, Goeben was portrayed by Czech actor Karel Dobrý.

Notes

References

1816 births
1880 deaths
People from Stade
People from the Kingdom of Hanover
German military personnel of the Franco-Prussian War
Military personnel of the First Carlist War
Generals of Infantry (Prussia)
Recipients of the Pour le Mérite (military class)
Recipients of the Grand Cross of the Iron Cross
Recipients of the Military Merit Cross (Mecklenburg-Schwerin)
Recipients of the Order of St. George of the Third Degree
Recipients of the Order of Isabella the Catholic
Laureate Cross of Saint Ferdinand
Military personnel from Lower Saxony